The Lockheed Senior Peg was an experimental design for a stealth aircraft by the Lockheed Corporation together with Rockwell International that competed with and lost to a design by Northrop (Senior Ice), which would eventually become the Northrop Grumman B-2 Spirit. It was created as part of the Advanced Technology Bomber competition, which started in 1979. It resembles a larger F-117 Nighthawk.

References

Senior Peg
1970s United States experimental aircraft
Cancelled military aircraft projects of the United States
Stealth aircraft